Natalya is the Russian form of the female given name Natalia.

The name Natasha, being originally a diminutive form of Natalya, became an independent name outside the Russian-speaking states since the late 1800s.

People with the given name Natalya 
 Natalya Akhrimenko (born 1955), Russian shot putter
 Natalya Donchenko (1932–2022), Soviet speed skater
 Natalya Estemirova (1958–2009), Russian human rights activist
 Natalya German (born 1963), Soviet sprint athlete
 Natalya Gorbanevskaya (1936–2013), Russian poet, translator and civil rights activist
Natalya Marchenkova (born 1948), Ukrainian animator and animation director.
 Natalya Kushch-Mazuryk, née Kushch (born 1983), Ukrainian pole vaulter
 Natalya Melik Melikyan (1906–1989), Armenian scientist
 Natalya Meshcheryakova (born 1972), Russian freestyle swimmer
 Natalya Neidhart (born 1982), Canadian professional wrestler
 Natalya Pasichnyk (born 1971), Swedish-Ukrainian classical pianist
 Natalya Snytina (born 1971), Russian biathlete
 Natalya Sutyagina (born 1980), Russian butterfly swimmer
 Natalya Sumska (born 1956), Ukrainian actress of theater and cinema, television hostess
 Natalya Synyshyn (born 1985), Ukrainian (until 2013) and Azerbaijani (since 2014) wrestler
 Natalya Yakovenko, Ukrainian historian and academic
 Natalya Yermolovich (born 1964), Soviet javelin thrower
 Natalya Zabolotnaya (born 1985), Russian weightlifter

Fictional characters
 Natalya Rostova, Countess in War and Peace
 Natalya Simonova, Bond girl in GoldenEye
 Natalya, assassin in novel series H.I.V.E. (The Higher Institute of Villainous Education)
 Natalya, doll in the Groovy Girls line
 Natalya, a mage-type character in Arena of Valor

See also
 Nataliya, female given name

Russian feminine given names